Ibinda is a language of Cabinda, Angola.  Ibinda can also refer to:

Places
Ibinda, a town in Guéra, Chad
Ibinda, a town in Abala, Plateaux, Republic of the Congo

Other
Ibinda (Age set), a social institution among the Kalenjin people of Kenya
Ibinda, the name used by the separatist Republic of Cabinda for its currency

See also
Ibanda